Scirpophaga bipunctatus is a moth in the family Crambidae. It was described by Rothschild in 1926. It is found in Sudan.

References

Moths described in 1926
Schoenobiinae
Moths of Africa